This article lists the heads of government of Ivory Coast, officially the Republic of Côte d'Ivoire, since the country gained independence from France in 1960. Patrick Achi currently serves as Prime Minister of Ivory Coast.

List

Key
Political parties

Other factions

Officeholders

Notes

See also
Ivory Coast 
List of heads of state of Ivory Coast
List of colonial governors of Ivory Coast 
Politics of Ivory Coast 
Lists of office-holders

References

Sources
 Guinness Book of Kings Rulers & Statesmen, Clive Carpenter, Guinness Superlatives Ltd.

Government of Ivory Coast
List
Cote d'Ivoire, List of Prime Ministers of
heads of government